Matt Harmon (born 4 December 1995) is a United States rugby union player, currently playing for the New Orleans Gold of Major League Rugby (MLR) and the United States national team. His preferred position is prop.

Professional career
Harmon signed for Major League Rugby side New Orleans Gold for the 2021 Major League Rugby season, having also played for the side in 2019 and 2020. Harmon made his debut for United States against England during the 2021 July rugby union tests.

References

External links
itsrugby.co.uk Profile

1995 births
Living people
United States international rugby union players
Rugby union props
American rugby union players
New Orleans Gold players